Cees Houtman, Cornelis Houtman (born April 6, 1945 in Bodegraven) is a Dutch emeritus professor of Old Testament at the Protestant Theological University in Kampen-1. He published on the Pentateuch, the interpretation of the Book of Exodus, the history of Dutch Bible translations and the Old Testament study in the Netherlands. After 2006 he focused on topics of book and church history, and the reception of the Bible in Dutch-language literature from the eighteenth century onwards.

Life

Education 

From 1974, Houtman holds a Ph.D. from the Vrije Universiteit Amsterdam with the dissertation De Hemel in het Oude Testament. Een onderzoek naar de voorstellingen van het oude Israel omtrent de kosmos under his doctoral advisor Nico H. Ridderbos.

Academic work 

From 1970 Houtman worked at the Vrije Universiteit Amsterdam, and since 1990, at the Theological University in Kampen, where from 1993 to 1997 he was rector (dean).

From 1990 to 2022 he participated in the work of the editorial team of the Historical Commentary on the Old Testament, until 2006 as its secretary. From 1999 to 2006 he was the president of the  editorial team of the Biografisch Lexicon voor de geschiedenis van het Nederlandse protestantisme.

Works

Thesis

Books

Articles

References

Sources

External links
Bibliography from the year 2006

1945 births
Academic staff of Vrije Universiteit Amsterdam
Academic staff of Protestant Theological University
Vrije Universiteit Amsterdam alumni
Old Testament scholars
Living people